Events from the year 1464 in France

Incumbents
 Monarch – Louis XI

Events
 Unknown - Catholicon the first French dictionary is compiled by Jehan Lagadeuc

Births
 Philippe Villiers de L'Isle-Adam, soldier (died 1534)

References

1460s in France